Antonietta is an Italian given name that is a diminutive form of Antonia in use in Italy. Notable people with this name include the following:

People
Maria Antonietta Beluzzi (1930–1997), Italian born actress
Antonietta Brandeis (1849–1920), Austrian painter
Antonietta Di Martino (born 1978), Italian high jumper
Antonietta Marini-Rainieri (19th century), Italian operatic soprano
Antonietta Meneghel (1893–1975), stage name Toti Dal Monte, Italian operatic soprano
Antonietta Meo (1930–1937), Venerable Italian child
Antonietta Pastori (born 1929), Italian operatic soprano
Maria Antonietta Picconi (born 1869), Italian composer and pianist
Antonietta Raphael (1895–1975), Italian sculptor and painter
Antonietta Stella (1929–2022), Italian operatic soprano

Royalty
Isabella Maria Luisa Antonietta Ferdinanda Giuseppina Saveria Domenica Giovanna, Princess Isabella of Parma (1741–1763)
Maria Antonietta Anna of the Two Sicilies (1814–1898), Grand Duchess of Tuscany from 1833 to 1859 as the consort of Leopold II
Maria Antonietta of Naples (1784–1806), Spanish crown princess
Maria Antonietta of Spain (1729–1785), Infanta of Spain
Princess Maria Antonietta of Bourbon-Two Sicilies (1851–1938), Princess of Bourbon-Two Sicilies by birth and by her marriage to Prince Alfonso

See also

Antonetta
Antoinette, another form of the feminine given name
Antonieta (given name)
Antonietti

References

Italian feminine given names